Llanveynoe is a village and civil parish in Herefordshire, England, near the Welsh border and the Brecon Beacons National Park, 14 miles (23 km) south west of Hereford. The parish had a population of 104 in the 2001 UK Census and shares the Longtown grouped parish council with Craswall, Longtown and Walterstone.

The village is situated on a ridge of higher land between the Olchon Valley and the valley of the River Monnow.

In the Herefordshire volume of The Buildings of England, Pevsner noted the beautiful setting and views from the church but regarded the building as being of little architectural interest following restoration in the 19th century.

References

External links

 Llanveynoe, GENUKI genealogy web portal
 List of monuments in the parish — most of the sites are on private property and are not open to the public

Villages in Herefordshire
Civil parishes in Herefordshire